John Coffman may refer to:

 John S. Coffman (1848–1899), leader in the Mennonite Church
 John Coffman, developer of LILO (boot loader)